Mihira Bhoja (c. 836–885 CE) or Bhoja I was a king belonging to the Gurjara-Pratihara Dynasty. He succeeded his father Ramabhadra. Bhoja was a devotee of Vishnu and adopted the title of Ādivarāha which is inscribed on some of his coins. One of the outstanding political figures of India in ninth century, he ranks with Dhruva Dharavarsha and Dharmapala as a great general and empire builder.

At its height, Bhoja's empire extended to Narmada River in the South, Sutlej River in the northwest, and up to Bengal in the east. It extended over a large area from the foot of the Himalayas up to the river Narmada and included the present district of Etawah in Uttar Pradesh.

Reign 

During his reign, the capital was in Kannauj (present-day Uttar Pradesh), during his period Kannauj was referred as Panchala.

He was a bitter enemy of the Arab invaders who, according to an Arab chronicler, Sulaiman, maintained a large army and had a fine cavalry.

He was succeeded by his son Mahendrapala I (c.836 - 910 CE).

Military career 
Mihira Bhoja first consolidated his territories by crushing the rebellious feudatories in Rajasthan, before turning his attention against the old enemies the Palas and Rastrakutas.
The Palas of Bengal, ruled by King Devapala (c. 810–850), were reputed to have 

When Mihira Bhoja started his career reverses and defeats suffered by his father Ramabhadra had considerably lowered the prestige of the Royal family. He invaded the Pala Empire of Bengal, but was defeated by Devapala

He then launched a campaign to conquer the territories to the south of his empire and was successful, Malwa, Deccan and Gujarat were conquered. In Gujarat he Stepped into a war of succession for the throne of Gujarat between Dhruva II of the Gujarat Rashtrakuta dynasty and his younger brother, Bhoja led a cavalry raid into Gujarat against the Dhruva while supporting his Dhruva's younger brother. Although the raid was repulsed by Dhruva II. Bhoja was able to retain dominion over parts of Gujarat and Malwa.
 
The Pratiharas were defeated in large battle in Ujjain by Rastrakutas of Gujarat however, retribution followed on the part of the Pratiharas,by the end of his reign, Bhoja had successfully destroyed the Gujarat Rashtrakuta dynasty.

Bhoja's feudatory, the‌ Guhilas chief named Harsha of Chatsu, is described as :
 Besides being a conqueror, Bhoja was a great diplomat.
The Kingdoms which were conquered and acknowledged his suzerainty includes Travani, Valla, Mada, Arya, Gujaratra,Lata Parvarta 
and Chandelas of Bundelkhand. Bhoja's Daulatpura-Dausa Inscription(AD 843), confirms his rule in Dausa region. Another inscription states that,"Bhoja's territories extended to the east of the Sutlej river."

Kalhana's Rajatarangini states that the territories of Bhoja extended to Kashmir in the north, and bhoja had conquered Punjab by defeating ruling ‘Thakkiyaka’ dynasty .

After Devapala's death, Bhoja defeated the Pala King Narayanapala and expanded his boundaries eastward into Pala-held territories near Gorakhpur.

Hudud-ul-Alam a tenth century Persian geographic text states that most of the kings of India acknowledged the supremacy of the powerful ‘Rai of Qinnauj’, (kannauj was the capital of Imperial Pratiharas) whose mighty army had 150,000 strong cavalry and 800 war elephants.

His son Mahenderpal I (890–910), expanded further eastwards in Magadha, Bengal, and Assam.

Coins of Mihira Bhoja

Mihira Bhoja's epithet was Srimad-Adivaraha (the fortunate primeval boar incarnation of Vishnu) and therefore there is a broad agreement amongst the scholars on the attribution of adivaraha dramma billon coins to him. These coins have a depiction of Adivaraha on the obverse. On the obverse along with the God Adivaraha, in his right there is a solar wheel with spokes and in the left are other emblems such as mace, lotus flower and conch-shell. Under the feet of the God is probably a two-headed serpent.

According to Alexander Cunningham these types of coins are only found in silver and copper. It is suggested that Copper coins were originally coated with silver to circulate as silver coins.

Adivarah coins were noted by Thakkar pheru in 13th century text Dravya-Pariksha who was mint master under Alauddin khilji.

Notes

References

885 deaths
9th-century Indian monarchs
People from Kannauj
Pratihara empire
830s births
Hindu monarchs
Indian military leaders